Helene Jensen is a former Danish curler.

Her sister Angelina Jensen was her teammate.

Teams

References

External links
 

Danish female curlers
European curling champions
Danish curling champions